Fervor Records is an American independent record label based in Phoenix, Arizona. The company was founded in 1989 and is now owned and operated by David Hilker and Jeff Freundlich. The label creates compilations of previously released and unreleased music, reissues original albums and singles, and releases music from heritage and contemporary artists across numerous genres. The catalog includes many Billboard charting songs as well as major label, Hall of Fame, and Grammy Award-winning artists. Fervor licenses music to television shows, films, advertising, and other media applications. The label releases limited physical product on CD, cassette, vinyl, and has products available on digital platforms worldwide.

History

Formation 
Fervor Records was founded in 1989 in Phoenix, Arizona by entrepreneurs David Hilker, Ted Bulger, Ron Pick and Michael Charlesworth as a subsidiary to Wild Whirled Music Group which also included Mount Pilot Music Publishing Company, BMI. The company was first headquartered in an office/warehouse space on Gelding Drive in the Scottsdale Airpark in Scottsdale, Arizona.

First release 
From their offices in Scottsdale, the fledgling company produced the first charity Christmas compilation in Arizona, which sold over 4,000 copies in six weeks.  The disc, Southwest Holiday benefited Central Arizona Shelter Services, a homeless shelter in Phoenix. "Our goal," said Hilker, "was to unite the music community and do something positive."

Move to Sunnyslope 
In 1991, Hilker and his songwriting/production partner, John Costello, opened a recording studio, Wild Whirled Recording, at 600 West Dunlap Avenue in the Sunnyslope neighborhood of Phoenix. It was in a strip mall next to a laundromat. This address also served as Fervor's new headquarters. The studio serviced many client recording sessions. Hilker and Costello also produced a variety of singers and rappers focused primarily on hip-hop and R&B.

Other early releases 
Fervor achieved local success with three additional compilation releases: Arizona Unplugged, Blue Saguaro, and Musicians for St. Mary's (a second charity release, this one for St. Mary's Food Bank in Phoenix). Artists appearing on these albums include Jeff Dayton, The Phoenix Boys Choir, Hans Olson, Brian Page & The Next, Cliff Sarde, genepool, Sonya Jason, J. David Sloan and Billy Williams, Bob Corritore, Chico Chism, Big Pete Pearson, The Rocket 88's, Sam Taylor, Scotty Spenner, Chief Gillame, Rena Haus, Buddy Reed and the Rip It Ups, The Hoodoo Kings, London Thompson, Pete Pancrazi and Diana Lee.

Current studios and offices 
By the mid 1990s, Bulger, Pick and Charlesworth had left the company, leaving Hilker in charge. In 2001, Fervor Records moved its headquarters and recording studios to its current location in Sunnyslope, Arizona.

Creation of Whirled Music Publishing, Inc. 
In 2002, Hilker and Costello teamed with New York City native, Jeff Freundlich, and formed Whirled Music Publishing, Inc. to expand further into music publishing and licensing. By 2006, Whirled Music Publishing, Inc. had acquired Fervor Records and affiliated brands. In 2016, John Costello left the company. Hilker serves as the company's CEO and Freundlich as COO.

Fervor catalog

Vintage music 
In 2007, the label began acquiring the rights to vintage songs and recordings from the 1920s through the 2000s, spanning numerous styles and sub-genres of pop, country, soul, blues, Americana, gospel, electronic, jazz, hip hop, rock and R&B.

Fervor Records controls rights to music from historical labels including Morrison Records (Seattle, Washington) MCI, Liberty Bell, REV, Ramco, ARA, Raina, and Mascot Records (Phoenix, Arizona) Royal Audio Music aka RAM Records, K, and Clif Records (Shreveport, LA) Comstock Records (Shawnee, Kansas), Trend Records (Canada) Up With People Records (Tucson, Arizona), Trend Records (Hollywood, California), Trod Nossel (Wallingford, Connecticut), WSJ Records (New York, NY), and Triplett Records (Chicago, Illinois).

Billboard charting songs 
Songs in the Fervor catalog that have charted on Billboard include "Cookin" by the Al Casey Combo, "Reconsider Me" by Margaret Lewis and Mira Ann Smith, and "A Teenager Feels it Too" by Denny Reed

Grammy Award winners 
Several of the artists in the Fervor catalog have received Grammy awards including Bill Champlin, Waylon JenningsSteve Vaus (aka Buck Howdy), Donna Fargo, and Jack Miller.

Arizona artists 
Based in Phoenix, Arizona, Fervor Records has a special interest in finding and promoting artists from Arizona. A large part of the Fervor catalog is the work of Arizona artists. In 2007, Fervor secured a significant catalog of recordings from Audio Recorders of Arizona, a music studio owned and managed by Floyd Ramsey. Ramsey had bequeathed the catalog to Arizona music historian John P. Dixon. Ramsey's studio recorded produced, and released music from notable musicians such as Sanford Clark, Duane Eddy, Donnie Owens, Lee Hazlewood, Al Casey, Waylon Jennings, Wayne Newton, Donna Fargo, and many others. In 2017, Fervor released the double LP Mid-Century Sounds: Deep Cuts from the Desert, which features many rare songs from the Audio Recorder's catalog.

Fervor also has other Arizona artists on their roster including Bruce Connole (The Jetzons, The Strand, The Cryptics, Suicide Kings/The Revenants), Hans Olson, Francine Reed, Big Pete Pearson, Chuck Hall, The Pistoleros, Loosely Tight, Connie Conway, Phil & the Frantics, Brian Page & The Next, Blue Shoes, Patti LaSalle, Jimmy Spellman, The Pills, Gentlemen Afterdark, The Sugar Thieves, Fayuca, Super Stereo, CooBee Coo, Noonday Devils, Christopher Blue, Andy Gonzales Y Sus Amigos, Charity Lockhart, Paris James, Diana Lee, and We the People.

Other artists of note 
Fervor controls the back catalog of British bassist and songwriter Tony Stevens. Stevens is well known as a founding member of Savoy Brown and co-founder of Foghat.  The label also owns several songs featuring vocalist Bill Champlin of the band, Chicago.

MTV success 
In 2011, Fervor signed Tempe, Arizona band Super Stereo. The band made it to the Top Five on MTVU and stayed on their charts for 35 weeks with their video single, "Life Passed Me By."

Also in 2011, NYC rapper Tarik NuClothes was signed to Fervor Records. His single, "Bubble Shaker" was featured on MTV and other popular TV shows.

In 2013, Fervor signed Phoenix Latin act, Fayuca. Their single, "Por Que Seguir" came in first place on the MTV show The Freshman and went into full rotation on the MTVU broadcast network.

In 2014, Fervor Records signed upstate New York band Reckless Serenade. The band's video single "Two Years Too Late" won first place on mtvU's The Freshman and went into full rotation on the MTVU broadcast network.

In 2015, Fervor Records signed Gilbert, Arizona duo, CooBee Coo. Their video single "Never Gonna Leave Your Side" won first place on mtvU's The Freshman and went into full rotation on the mtvU broadcast network.

Licensing success 
Placing music in TV and film has become the label's primary focus. Over the years, Fervor has created relationships with music supervisors from many different production companies. Fervor has also collected a catalog of music which spans almost 100 years and a wide variety of genres. Music supervisors often call Fervor when they need music to fit a certain scene but don't want a famous song. Song placements help perpetuate the legacy of artists while exposing their work to new audiences. Music from the Fervor catalog has been placed in many feature films including The Glass Castle (2017), Green Book (2018), The Mule (2018), Glass (2019), and If Beale Street Could Talk (2018); popular video-streaming series including Stranger Things, Ozark, and Narcos; and numerous television series including This is Us, One Tree Hill, and Parenthood. Fervor's music has also been played in a variety of commercials.

Awards 
In 2018, Fervor Records was named Best Record Label in Phoenix, Arizona by the Phoenix New Times.

Status and distribution 
The label markets the classic collection as Fervor Records One Stop Shop Vintage Masters Series, Exploring the Sound of American Music Culture. Catalog titles include:

 Vintage Masters 1957–1967
 Vintage Soul 1962–1984
 Vintage Rock 1981–1988
 Vintage New Wave & Pop 1981–1987
 Vintage Mainstream Rock & Hot AC 1980–1989
 Vintage Country 1957–1969
 Vintage Masters 1970–1979
 Vintage Masters 1960's Rock & Pop

Fervor Records Vintage Masters is not affiliated with the label Vintage Masters, Inc.

Fervor artists

2 da Groove
1933
Absolute Ceiling
Affordable Lawn Care
Al Casey
Al Kerbey
Alex Bevan
Andy Gerold
Andy Gonzales Y Sus Amigos
Anna Vivette
Band X
Becca Kotte
Bent Wind
Big Pete Pearson
Billy Clone and The Same
Blitz Girls
Blue Shoes
Bobby Barnes
Bob Kelly
Bob McGilpin
Bopert Davidson
Boxcar
Box of Cherries
Branch Estate
Brian Page & The Next
Bright Moments
Broken Bellows
Bruce Connole
Buck Storm
Cargo
Carl Coccomo
Chilo Escobedo
Chimeras
Christopher Blue

Chuck Hall and The Brick Wall
City Kids
Clyde Lucas
Connie Conway
CooBee Coo
Courtney Cotter King
Craig Erickson
Craig Marsden
Cryptics
Dan Darrah
David Hardin
Dawn Jameson
Derrick Procell
Dexter Lee More
Diana Duvall
Dick Flood
Donnie Owens
DUCE
Eddy M Melanson
Fastgun
Fat City
Faustus
Fayuca
Francine Reed
Frank Fafara
Fred Lederman
freebridge
Gene Pool
Gentlemen Afterdark
Geoff Grace
Geronimo
Glass Heroes
GWB
Hans Olson
Harry Krapsho

If Walls Could Talk
Jailhouse
Jay Ramsey
Jerry Honigman
Jimmy Spellman
Joe Montgomery
Johnny Amoroso
Juanita Brown
Just Water
Kindred
Lab-Rats
Lee Hurst
Len Boone
Lionel Lodge
Lisa Marie Smith
Live Nudes
Lloyd Conger
Lonnegan's Band
Loosely Tight
Lucian Blaque
Lynn Ready
Mail Order Brides
Marcus
Marcus Latief Scott
Margaret Lewis
Matter
Mile Ends
Mira Ann Smith
Morrie Morrison Orchestra
Mr. Fantastic
Muevate
Nadine Jansen
New York Electric Piano

Noon Day Devils
Paris James
Patti LaSalle
Patty Parker
Paul Taneja
Peter Blair
Peter Sivo
Phil & the Frantics
Phunklogistix
Pistoleros
PM Nightly
Pop Kultur
Poor Boy Rappers
Primas Stefan and his Royal Tziganes
RED
Red Johnson
Reggae Revolution
Rhett Davis
Rich Dolmat
Rick Coyne
Reckless Serenade
Ron Higgins
Sandy Szigeti
Sanford Clark
Shoeshine Boy
Simplistics
Slyder
Steven Staryk
Super Stereo
Tarik NuClothes
The Real Dark Half
The Chimeras
The Fly Bi-Nites

The Gigalos
The Gringos
The Jack Gray Orchestra
The Jetzons
The Kollektion
The Mears Brothers
The Newlyweds
The Outlets
The Pills
The Romeos
The Souls
The Soul Blenders
The Soulsations
The Spiffs
The Suicide Kings/The Revenants
The Strand
The Sugar Thieves
The Triplett Twins
Tom Martin
Tony Stevens
UKASE
We The People
White Heat
ZELLOTS
Zues

Discography 
 FVRCD06037 Amazing Hits of the Transistor Era Vol. 1 – Various Artists
 FVRCD06038 Amazing Hits of the Transistor Era Vol. 2 – Various Artists
 FVRCD06024 Fervor Divas Sing the Ballads – Various Artists
 FVRCD06031 The Beautiful Music of Elevators – Various Artists
 FVRCD06033 Old World Folk – Various Artists
 FVRCD06028 Muevate! – Muevate!
 FVRCD06029 Drop the Needle – RLO
 FVRCD06026 Paul Taneja – Paul Taneja
 FVRCD06032 The World Goes Pop! – Matt Hirt
 FVRCD06023 Paradise – Kathy Cushman
 FVRCD06016 Another Day with the Blues – Hans Olson
 FVRCD06015 Freestyle – Greg Anderson
 FVRCD06014 Trance Anthology Vol. 2 – DJ Jay C Three
 FVRCD06013 Trance Anthology Vol. 1 – DJ Jay C Three
 FVRCD06027 Electric Mayhem – 2 Da Groove
 FVRCD06007 Pure House – 2 Da Groove
 FVRCD06012 Andy Gerold – Andy Gerold
 FVRCD06011 Thrashin' Action – Brian Rogers
 FVRCD06006 Attack of the DJ's! – DJ Uff Da/DJ Jay C Three
 FVRCD06030 Fervor Chillout Sessions Vol. 1 – John Costello
 FVRCD06017 Apasionado – John Costello
 FVRCD06001 A Cooler Shade of Jazz – John Costello
 FVRCD06018 Spheres – John Costello
 FVRCD06002 Falling Forward – Mark Long
 FVRCD06003 Barrio Reggaeton – Morgan Butler/Jason DeRoss
 FVRCD06004 Reggae Revolution! – Reggae Revolution
 FVRCD06019 Acid Jazz Underground – Rich Dolmat
 FVRCD06020 Easy Listening Symph-o-Nette – The Jack Gray Orchestra
 FVRCD06010 Nu R&B – Various Artists
 FVRCD06021 Porno SoundtraXXX – Various Artists
 FVRCD06004 Thi$ I$ Hip Hop—Volume 1 – Various Artists
 FVRCD06005 Thi$ I$ Hip Hop—Volume 2 – Various Artists
 FVRCD06006 Thi$ I$ Hip Hop—Volume 3 – Various Artists
 FVRCD06021 Ultimate Lounge – Various Artists
 FVRC001 Southwest Holiday – Various Artists
 FVRC112 Arizona Unplugged – Various Artists
 FVRCD120 Blue Saguaro – Various Artists
 FVRCD97001 Musicians for St. Mary's – Various Artists

See also
 List of record labels

References

External links
 

American independent record labels
Netlabels
Record labels based in Arizona
Record labels established in 1990
Online music stores of the United States